Mackay John Scobie Mackenzie (23 January 1845 – 15 September 1901), known as Scobie, was an independent conservative Member of Parliament in New Zealand.

Biography
Mackenzie was born in Tain in Scotland in 1845. He moved from Victoria to the Otago region in 1870 to manage the Deepdell sheep station on an invitation by Donald McLean and Matthew Holmes. He married Jessy Adela Bell in 1876, the only daughter of Dillon Bell.

He represented the Mount Ida electorate from 1884 to 1893, when he was defeated for Waihemo.
In 1884 he supported the Stout–Vogel Ministry and became the government's Whip.
However Mackenzie would later leave the Stout-Vogelites in protest of new tariffs and the notion of female enfranchisement, joining the opposition conservative MPs.

He then represented the multi-member City of Dunedin electorate from 1896 to 1899 when he was defeated.

Mackenzie died at his home in Dunedin on 15 December 1901, and was buried at Andersons Bay Cemetery.

References

1845 births
1901 deaths
19th-century New Zealand politicians
Burials at Andersons Bay Cemetery
Members of the New Zealand House of Representatives
New Zealand MPs for Dunedin electorates
New Zealand MPs for South Island electorates
People from Ross and Cromarty
Scottish emigrants to New Zealand
Unsuccessful candidates in the 1881 New Zealand general election
Unsuccessful candidates in the 1893 New Zealand general election
Unsuccessful candidates in the 1899 New Zealand general election